Sains-lès-Marquion is a commune in the Pas-de-Calais department in the Hauts-de-France region of France.

Geography

Population

Places of interest
 The church of St. Saturnine, rebuilt along with much of the village after World War I.
 The war memorial.
 The Commonwealth War Graves Commission cemeteries.

See also
Communes of the Pas-de-Calais department

References

External links

 The CWGC military cemetery
 Quarry Wood CWGC cemetery
 Ontario CWGC cemetery

Sainslesmarquion